Woori may refer to:

Woori Bank (Hangul: 우리은행 Uri Eunhaeng, SWIFT HVBKKRSE, numeric 020), bank headquartered in Seoul, South Korea
Woori CBV Securities Corporation (formerly known as Bien Viet Securities), Vietnam provider of financial and investment services
Woori Financial Group, Seoul-based banking and financial services holdings company and is the largest bank in South Korea
Woori Heroes or Nexen Heroes (Hangul: 넥센 히어로즈 야구단) are a South Korean professional baseball team based in Seoul
Woori Yallock, town in Victoria, Australia

See also
Woolrich